Hammerwich is a small village and civil parish in the Lichfield District, in Staffordshire, England. It is southeast of Burntwood and northeast of Brownhills.

Name
The name may derive from hamor (Old English: a hammer) and wīc (Old English: a place of industry, specialist agriculture or trading), indicating a smithy or metal-working site.

Charcoal burning, nail making, agriculture and coal mining have all been prevalent in the village over the years.

Culture
Amenities in the village at present include a community centre, a Women's Institute hall and St John the Baptist Church. There are also numerous green lanes, footpaths and streams in the surrounding countryside.

Anglo-Saxon archaeology

See also
Listed buildings in Hammerwich

References

External links

Villages in Staffordshire
Civil parishes in Staffordshire
Archaeological sites in Staffordshire